Sailing/Yachting is an Olympic sport starting from the Games of the 1st Olympiad (1896 Olympics in Athens, Greece). With the exception of 1904 and possibly the canceled 1916 Summer Olympics, sailing has always been included on the Olympic schedule. The Sailing program of 1992 consisted of a total of ten sailing classes (disciplines). For each class races were scheduled from 27 July 1992 to 4 August 1992 of the coast of Barcelona, Spain on the Mediterranean Sea.

Venue 

According to the IOC statutes the contests in all sport disciplines must be held either in, or as close as possible to the city which the IOC has chosen. The weather conditions in Barcelona were found suitable for sailing. The waterfront of Barcelona was completely restructured for the Olympics. The Olympic port became one of the key Olympic areas of Barcelona.

The Olympic sailing competition was held in the Mediterranean waters outside the Olympic Harbor. The new harbor was designed to be the base for the Olympic sailors and a key factor in the opening up of the city to the sea. This was achieved by a Special Town Plan for the “Parc de Mar” Area including a harbor which satisfy the requirements of sailors and organizers. The new harbor serves after the Games as a marina.

A total of five race areas were created on the Mediterranean Sea.

Competition

Overview

Continents 
 Africa
 Asia
 Australian continent
 Europe
 North America
 South America

Countries

Classes (equipment)

Medal summary

Women's Events

Men's Events

Mixed Events

Medal table

Further information

Sailing 
 It was the first Olympic sailing contest where, besides fleet racing, a combination format of fleetracing and match racing was also used. Soling employed this latter format.

Sailors 
During the sailing regattas at the 1992 Summer Olympics the following people notable outside sailing took part:
 Royalty
 , Prince Felipe of Spain (later King Felipe VI), as midperson in the Soling

Notes

References 
 
 
 
 
 

 

 
1992 in sailing
1992 Summer Olympics events
1992